South Waikato District Council is the territorial authority for the South Waikato District of New Zealand.

The council is led by the mayor of South Waikato, who is currently . There are also ward councillors.

Composition

Councillors

 Mayor 
 Tokoroa Ward: Bill Machen, Arama Ngapo-Lipscombe, Thomas Lee, Marin Glucina, Hamish Daine, Alex Jansen
 Putāruru Ward: Sandra Wallace, Hans Nelis, Gary Petley
 Tīrau Ward: Peter Schulte

Community boards

 Tīrau Community Board: Kerry Purdy, Kevin Slater, Sharon Burling-Claridge, Christine Brasell, Councillor Peter Schulte

History

The council was established in 1989, through the merger of Putaruru Borough Council (established in 1926) and Tokoroa Borough Council (established in 1975). Matamata County Council, which had first met in 1909 and was based in Tīrau, was also part of the transitional committee in 1989.

References

External links

 Official website

South Waikato District
Politics of Waikato
Territorial authorities of New Zealand